The Rubashkin family is a family of American Hasidic Jews of the Chabad-Lubavitch  movement of Brooklyn, New York, headed by Aaron Rubashkin. Members of the family were or are active in various family businesses, most of them in the family's main business, kosher meat, for which they earned the title "kosher meat dynasty". The tight-knit family has been influential in its local area and is well known among religious Jews for its generosity towards Jews and Jewish causes.

Some of the family's activities have been controversial, and a few of its members have been the subject of legal investigations and convictions.

Notable family members
 Family patriarch  Aaron Rubashkin and Rivka Rubashkin
Moshe Rubashkin, son of Aaron Rubashkin
Sholom Rubashkin, son of Moshe Rubashkin
Sholom Mordechai Rubashkin, son of Aaron Rubashkin
Yaacov Weiss, son-in-law of Sholom Mordechai Rubashkin
Milton Balkany, son-in-law of Aaron Rubashkin (married daughter Sarah Rubashkin)

Family businesses

Kosher meat 
Rubashkin's, Inc. (established 1953) owned by Aaron Rubashkin, kosher butcher shop in Borough Park, Brooklyn, established as Lieberman & Rubashkin Glatt Kosher Butchers.
Agriprocessors, Inc. (established 1987, sold in auction July 2009) owned by Aaron Rubashkin, managed by his sons Sholom Mordechai and Heshy Zvi Rubashkin.
Agri-Food Distributors, Inc., founded in 1994, Aaron Rubashkin is listed as president, Sholom and Heshy Zvi Rubashkin are listed as officers.
Shemesh, Inc., Florida-based company founded in 1999 as a distribution center for Agriprocessors kosher meat products owned by Aaron Rubashkin. Gutol Goldman-Rubashkin, Sholom, Heshy Zvi and Yossi Rubashkin are listed as officers. After failing to file mandated reports with the state in 2005, the company was administratively dissolved. When it was reinstated in 2007, only Sholom Rubashkin was listed as a company officer. An amended report, filed in December 2008, removes him from the company and names Goldman as the sole officer.
Lagoon Technology, LLC, listed at Agriprocessors' physical address in Postville, Iowa, was formed in April 2005 to provide reimbursements to the city in connection with agreed upon maintenance of the waste lagoons.
Best Value, Inc., founded in 2001, Gutol Goldman-Rubashkin, Sholom, Heshy Zvi, and Joseph Rubashkin are listed as officers.
Best Value Distributors, Inc., formed in 2001, lists Sholom and Heshy Zvi Rubashkin as officers.
Best Value Food Products, LLC, formed in 2001, lists the same home office as Agriprocessors.
Cottonballs, LLC, listed at Agriprocessors' physical address in Postville, Iowa, was a poultry firm founded in late 2004 operated by the Rubashkin family.
Kosher Community Grocery, Inc., set up in May 2005, lists Sholom Rubashkin as president and secretary, and Heshy Zvi Rubashkin as president and treasurer.
Gemach Mamash Now Corporation, founded in 1996, has Sholom and Heshy Zvi Rubashkin listed as officers. The company provided interest-free loans to Jews.
Postville Rabbinical Academy, founded in 2000, Sholom and Heshy Zvi Rubashkin are listed as officers.
Crown Deli (established c. 1960) owned by Aaron Rubashkin, run by his wife Rivka Rubashkin, a restaurant on 13th Avenue in Brooklyn, described as more of a soup kitchen than a business.

Textile mills 
Cherry Hill Textiles, Inc. (established 1972, dissolved 1997) owned by Aaron Rubashkin and Moshe Rubashkin, managed by Moshe Rubashkin, was a corporation in Brooklyn, New York, engaged in the dyeing and finishing of textiles.
Montex Textiles Ltd. (established 1989, closed 2001) owned and managed by Moshe Rubashkin, was a textiles bleaching and dyeing company, in Allentown, Pennsylvania.

Real estate 
Nevel Properties Corporation, listed at Agriprocessors' post office box and physical address in Postville, Iowa, was registered in the state of Iowa in September 1994. Sholom and Heshy Zvi Rubashkin are listed as officers. Nevel Properties was the deed holder on 85 real estate interests in Postville, and a contract holder in three others in Allamakee County, Iowa, the deed holder on two properties in Fayette County, Iowa, on a commercial property in Clayton County, Iowa, and the contract holder on 10 properties in Winneshiek County, Iowa. The Company filed for Chapter 11 bankruptcy protection in March 2009. It had estimated liabilities between $1 million and $10 million. Unsecured creditors listed in the filing were primarily utility and service companies, and debts owed to them totaled just over $60,000.
Amereeka Properties LLC, a wholly owned subsidiary of Nevel Properties, registered in the state of Iowa on July 18, 2006. It was listed as the contract holder on eight Postville real estate interests and as the deed holder on two others, purchased on July 1, 2006.
SFG Corporation, registered in the state of Iowa in 1990 by Charles Kelly, a Postville attorney who was listed as the sole officer and director of the company until 2002, when his name was stricken from the documents and replaced with the names of Sholom and Heshy Zvi Rubashkin. At the same time the principal office was changed to the physical address of the Agriprocessors plant in Postville. The company had one real estate interest, vacant lots within the city of Postville, and a single real estate interest in Clayton County.
Platinum Rx, LLC, a New Jersey corporation, owned by Rubashkin family, with Sholom Rubashkin, son of Moshe Rubashkin, as director.
Skyline Industries, Inc., a New York corporation, owned by Rubashkin family, with Sholom Rubashkin, son of Moshe Rubashkin, as director.
Supreme Realty, LLC, real estate investment and management company, owned by Rubashkin family, with Sholom Rubashkin, son of Moshe Rubashkin, as director.

Legal Problems 
Several members of the family and some of the family's companies have faced legal problems.

Labor relations 
In 1995, Aaron Rubashkin and his son Moshe Rubashkin were found guilty by the National Labor Relations Board (NLRB) for having diverted union dues deducted from Cherry Hill Textiles′ employee wages. According to the NLRB judge, the textile mill had a "proclivity for violating" the labor law.
In 2001 Moshe Rubashkin was placed in an Accelerated Rehabilitation Disposition (ARD) program for a period of 18 months for having failed to secure worker′s compensation insurance for employees of Montex Textiles, required by Pennsylvania law.
In September 2005 workers at Agriprocessors' distribution site in Brooklyn voted to join the United Food and Commercial Workers union. The company did not recognize the vote, arguing that it was invalid because many of the workers who participated were in the U.S. illegally, making their votes invalid despite protection granted undocumented workers in the National Labor Relations Act. A National Labor Relations Board judge decided against the company and ordered it to recognize the vote.

In an article in 2006 The Jewish Daily Forward wrote that "AgriProcessors stands out for its poor treatment of workers", many of them undocumented immigrants who were afraid of being fired or deported, and that according to several industry experts Agriprocessors paid the lowest wages of any slaughterhouse in the United States.
In October 2008, the Iowa Labor Commission fined Agriprocessors $9.99 million for various violations of state labor law, including illegally deducting money from employees for safety equipment and failing to pay employees.

Environmental issues
In 2008 Moshe Rubashkin was sentenced to 16 months in prison in a toxic waste case at Montex Textiles. 
 Sholom Rubashkin, son of Moshe Rubashkin, was sentenced to four months in prison in 2009 for lying to the Environmental Protection Agency (EPA) about the family's role at Montex Textiles site.

Financial fraud 
In 2002 Moshe Rubashkin was sentenced to 15 months in prison on fraud charges.
In November 2009, Sholom Mordechai Rubashkin, son of Aaron Rubashkin, former top manager at Agriprocessors, was convicted of financial fraud, including bank fraud, mail and wire fraud and money laundering, in June 2010, he was sentenced to 27 years in prison. He was released from federal prison in Otisville, N.Y., after serving eight years of his sentence.
On December 16, 2010, U.S. District Judge Edward Joseph McManus ordered Aaron, Sholom and Heshy Tzvi Rubashkin to pay Federal Deposit Insurance Corporation (FDIC) nearly $290,000 plus interest for a $300,000 line of credit they received in 2007 for their property rental company Nevel Properties Corp. in Postville from Georgia-based Omni National Bank. The bank, which was shut down by federal regulators soon afterwards, sued the Rubashkins, who had personally guaranteed the $300,000 credit, after they stopped making payments. The judge also ordered Aaron Rubashkin, as former president of Agriprocessors, to pay Value Recovery Group, L.P. nearly $1.8 million plus interest for equipment sold during bankruptcy proceedings that Agriprocessors had formerly rented from Omni National Bank.
On December 20, 2017, President Donald J. Trump commuted the prison sentence of Sholom Rubashkin, an action encouraged by bipartisan leaders from across the political spectrum, from Orrin Hatch to Nancy Pelosi.

Extortion
 Milton Balkany, son-in-law of Aaron Rubashkin, rabbi, dean of the Bais Yaakov day school in Borough Park, was charged in early 2010 with trying to extort $4 million from a hedge fund. On November 10, 2010, he was found guilty of extortion, blackmail, wire fraud and making false statements in a Federal Court in Manhattan. He was released on a $1 million bond. On February 18, 2011, he was sentenced to four years in prison, and locked up immediately because the judge considered him a flight risk. He was previously charged with theft of Federal grant money, but was not prosecuted. On March 19, 2012, the U.S. Court of Appeals in Manhattan upheld the conviction.

Sexual molestation
 Yaacov Weiss, son-in-law of Sholom Mordechai Rubashkin, Lubavicher rabbi who established a Chabad center in Colonie, New York, and an affiliated Chabad Hebrew School, was indicted in August 2008 with charges of sexual abuse and child endangerment, and pleaded not guilty, calling the charges "100 percent untrue", attributing them to "an individual who has been antagonistic toward Chabad of Colonie from its inception and continues to be envious of continued success". Court papers alleged Weiss sexually abused two boys in 2007. The indictment also alleged that he repeatedly struck one of the boys on the back, "knocking him to the ground and then kicked him in the leg". In a plea bargain reached in January 2010, as his trial was set to begin in Albany County Court, he admitted to having had "inappropriate physical contact" with two naked boys, and to having told one of them to lie about it to the police and his mother. On March 8, he was sentenced to 60 days in jail and three years' probation, and was released after less than 40 days. Under the plea bargain, Weiss will not be listed in a registry of sex offenders, but he was suspended by Chabad, as soon as the charges were filed.

"Unity for Justice" project 
A musical production supporting the family's efforts to secure the release of Sholom Rubashkin from federal prison, made its debut on October 13, 2010. "The Rubashkin name has always been synonymous with charity as the Rubashkins gave of themselves, both financially and otherwise, to help those in need." An in-depth documentary of the charitable efforts of the Rubashkin family will be released before the end of 2010.

References

Further reading

External links
 Timeline: The Rubashkin family, owners of Agriprocessors in Postville. FightinBack, Daily Kos. November 25, 2008
Conrad Black The Rubashkin case: A Mockery of Justice

 
American food industry businesspeople
American Orthodox Jews
American people of Russian-Jewish descent
Chabad-Lubavitch (Hasidic dynasty)
Jewish-American families
Living people
American people convicted of fraud
American businesspeople convicted of crimes
Businesspeople in the meat packing industry
Year of birth missing (living people)